The Panlong River in an urban river in Kunming City, Yunnan, China.

The river receives a large quantity of municipal sewage and wastewater from industrial effluent.

The Panlong River of Kunming should not be confused with another, longer, river of the same name (also 盘龙江), which flows through south-eastern Yunnan and Vietnam, and enters the Red River.

References

External links 
Photo of Panlong River, Kunming
Wikimapia Panlong River – 盤龍河
Environmental Management Plan (EMP) Yunnan Urban Environment Project

Geography of Kunming
Rivers of Yunnan